Character generation may refer to:

 Character creation, the process of creating a character for a role-playing game.
 Character generator, a device or software that produces text for keying into a video stream.